Ababuj is a municipality located in the Comunidad de Teruel comarca, province of Teruel, Aragon, Spain. 
According to the 2010 census the municipality had a population of 77 inhabitants. Its postal code is 44155.

The town is located at high elevation between the Sierra del Pobo and Sierra de Gúdar, part of the Sistema Ibérico.

See also
Comunidad de Teruel
List of municipalities in Teruel
Municipal elections in Ababuj

References

External links 

CAI Aragon, Afbabuj

Municipalities in the Province of Teruel